Dorn (German for thorn) is a German/Austrian and Dutch/Flemish surname. Notable people with the surname include:

Angela Dorn-Rancke, German politician
August T. Dorn (1849-1923), American politician
Dieter Dorn (born 1935), German theatre director
Dolores Dorn (1934–2019), American film actor
Edward John Dorn (1854-1937), United States Naval officer and Governor of Guam
Ed Dorn (1929–1999), U.S. poet
Earl Van Dorn (1820–1863), U.S. major general
Friedrich Ernst Dorn (1848–1916), German physicist
Francis E. Dorn (1911–1987), member of the United States House of Representatives
George W. Dorn (1836–1891), President of the Chico Board of Trustees in 1872
Gerhard Dorn (c. 1530 – 1584), Belgian philosopher, translator, alchemist, physician and bibliophile
Heinrich Dorn (1804–1892), German conductor and composer
Ivan Dorn (born 1988), Ukrainian singer, DJ, TV presenter and producer
Jennifer Dunbar Dorn, English writer and filmmaker
Jerry verDorn (1948–2022), American actor
Joel Dorn (1942–2007), music producer
Johannes Albrecht Bernhard Dorn (1805–1881), German orientalist
Ludwik Dorn (1954–2022), Polish politician
Luke Dorn (born 1982), rugby player
Michael Dorn (born 1952), U.S. actor
Myles Dorn (born 1998), American football player
Robert C. Dorn, New York politician
Roosevelt F. Dorn (born 1935), mayor
Rüdiger Dorn (born 1969), game designer
Thea Dorn (born 1970), German writer
Walter Dorn (born 1961), scientist, educator, author and researcher
William Jennings Bryan Dorn (1916–2005), U.S. politician

Fictional characters:
Fandorin, a fictitious Russian surname derived from von Dorn
Van Dorn Detective Agency, a fictitious detective agency in a series of novels by Clive Cussler
Dorn Marto, a character in the video game Star Ocean
 Eliot Dorn, character on The Edge of Night
Rogal Dorn, one of the twenty primarchs and leader of the Imperial Fists in table top game Warhammer 40,000
Roger Dorn (played by Corbin Bernsen), third baseman for the Cleveland Indians in the 1989 movie Major League (film), the 1994 sequel Major League II and the 1998 third installment "Major League: Back to the_Minors"
Chris Dorn and son Kurt Dorn, wheat farmers in Zane Grey's 1919 novel The Desert of Wheat

See also 
Death of David Dorn

German-language surnames
Jewish surnames